Matthew John Gogel (born February 9, 1971) is an American professional golfer and golf commentator who currently plays on the PGA Tour Champions. He previously played on the PGA Tour and the Nike Tour.

Gogel was born in Denver, Colorado and grew up in Tulsa, Oklahoma, where he attended Bishop Kelley High School. He has lived most of his adult life in Kansas. He attended the University of Kansas, and was a member of the golf team. He turned pro in 1994 and joined the PGA Tour in 2000.

Gogel played in Asia early in his professional career and on the Nike Tour (which later became known as the Nationwide Tour). He is the first player in Nationwide Tour history to win in four consecutive years. He earned his PGA Tour card for 2000 by finishing 7th on the Nationwide Tour money list in 1999. His two best finishes in official PGA Tour events came at the AT&T Pebble Beach National Pro-Am: he won the tournament in 2002 and finished T-2 in 2000. His best finish in a major championship is a T-12 at the 2001 U.S. Open.

After losing his tour card in 2006, Gogel announced an intention to retire after the 2007 AT&T Pebble Beach National Pro-Am.

In June 2007, Gogel joined The Golf Channel as an on-course reporter for its PGA Tour Coverage. His first event was the 2007 Travelers Championship. He joined CBS Sports as a commentator in 2009.

After turning 50, Gogel left broadcasting and joined the PGA Tour Champions. In the 2020–21 season, he finished 63rd in the Charles Schwab Cup Championship. 

He lives in Mission Hills, Kansas.

Professional wins (8)

PGA Tour wins (1)

Nike Tour wins (6)

Nike Tour playoff record (3–0)

Other wins (1)
1995 Kansas Open

Results in major championships

Note: Gogel never played in the Masters Tournament.

CUT = missed the half-way cut
"T" = tied

Results in The Players Championship

CUT = missed the halfway cut
"T" indicates a tie for a place

Results in World Golf Championships

QF, R16, R32, R64 = Round in which player lost in match play
"T" = Tied

Results in senior major championships

CUT = missed the halfway cut
"T" indicates a tie for a place

See also
1999 Nike Tour graduates
List of golfers with most Korn Ferry Tour wins

References

External links

American male golfers
Kansas Jayhawks men's golfers
PGA Tour golfers
Korn Ferry Tour graduates
Golfers from Denver
Golfers from Oklahoma
Golfers from Kansas
Sportspeople from Tulsa, Oklahoma
People from Mission Hills, Kansas
1971 births
Living people